North West Coastal Highway is a generally north-south Western Australian highway which links the coastal city of Geraldton with the town of Port Hedland. The  road, constructed as a sealed two-lane single carriageway, travels through remote and largely arid landscapes. Carnarvon is the only large settlement on the highway, and is an oasis within the harsh surrounding environment. The entire highway is allocated National Route 1, part of Australia's Highway 1, and parts of the highway are included in tourist routes Batavia Coast Tourist Way and Cossack Tourist Way. Economically, North West Coastal Highway is an important link to the Mid West, Gascoyne and Pilbara regions, supporting the agricultural, pastoral, fishing, and tourism industries, as well as mining and offshore oil and gas production.

In Geraldton, the highway begins at a grade separated interchange with Brand Highway and roads providing access to the port and town centre. Two major roads link the North West Coastal Highway to the inland Great Northern Highway: Geraldton–Mount Magnet Road in Geraldton, and Nanutarra Munjina Road at Nanutarra,  further north. Several roads link provide access to coastal towns and attractions, including Shark Bay Road, Onslow Road and Karratha Road. With few towns on the highway, roadhouses are the only settlements for long stretches. North West Coastal Highway ends at Great Northern Highway,  out from Port Hedland.

North West Coastal Highway was created in 1944 from existing roads and tracks through remote pastoral areas. However, it was a hazardous route that could be dusty in the dry season, and boggy or washed away in the wet season. Economic growth and development in northern Western Australia prompted initial improvement efforts in the late 1940s, and a sealed road was constructed from Geraldton to Carnarvon by 1962. The impact of cyclones and seasonal flooding resulted in a realignment inland of the Carnarvon to Port Hedland section, which was constructed and sealed between 1966 and 1973, and required thirty new bridges. Various upgrades have been carried out in sections across the length of the highway, including the Geraldton Southern Transport Corridor project which grade-separated the highway's junction with Brand Highway.

Route description
North West Coastal Highway is the coastal route through Western Australia's remote north-west. From the Mid West city of Geraldton, the highway heads north  to the small town of Northampton, and another  to Carnarvon, the only large settlement along the route. Apart from Whim Creek, between Roebourne and Port Hedland, roadhouses serving the highway are the only settlements on the long stretches of rangeland expanses between these towns. The highway provides access to tourist destinations including Shark Bay, Coral Bay, and Exmouth. North West Coastal Highway supports the diversified economies of the Mid West and Gascoyne regions, including mining, agriculture, fishing and tourism, transitioning to primarily mining, pastoral stations and offshore oil and  gas production in the Pilbara.

The entire highway is allocated National Route 1, part of Australia's Highway 1, and parts of the highway are included in the tourist routes Batavia Coast Tourist Way (Tourist Drive 354) and Cossack Tourist Way (Tourist Drive 351).

Main Roads Western Australia monitors traffic volume across the state's road network, including various locations along North West Coastal Highway. In the 2012/13 financial year, the recorded traffic volumes ranged from 13,350 vehicles per day west of Geraldton–Mount Magnet Road down to 370 north of Minilya–Exmouth Road. The highest percentage of heavy vehicles was 45.5%, west of Karratha Road. Reports commissioned by the Royal Automobile Club of Western Australia (RAC) in 2006 and 2008 gave most of the highway a four-star safety rating out of five, but with a significant proportion rated at a three-star level. The overall highway network was generally rated as three-star or four-star, with around 10% in 2006 and 5% in 2008 receiving a two-star rating.

Geraldton to Carnarvon 

North West Coastal Highway commences at a diamond interchange at the northern end of Brand Highway. It heads east from the interchange and curves round to the north, past a traffic-light intersection with Geraldton–Mount Magnet Road. The highway continues north through Geraldton's outer suburbs for  before the landscape transitions to scrubland. Between Geraldton and Carnarvon, the highway passes through remote and dry semi-desert areas. Apart from Northampton,  out from Geraldton, the only settlements over this  stretch are four roadhouses.

Carnarvon, at the mouth of the Gascoyne River, is the only large town between Geraldton and Karratha, and is an oasis within an arid region. East of the town, the landscape near the river features banana and other horticultural plantations, while the vegetation in the surrounding region is primarily shrublands.

Carnarvon to Port Hedland 
North of Carnarvon, the highway passes through desert and becomes very flat. Bridges span many ephemeral rivers and creeks, with strands of eucalyptus along their floodplains. The next roadhouse,  beyond Carnarvon, is the Minilya Roadhouse adjacent to the Minilya River.  further on is the turnoff to the North West Cape area, including Cape Range National Park, Coral Bay and Exmouth.

North West Coastal Highway reaches the Pilbara after , where it deviates further inland. Nearby it intersects Nanutarra Munjina Road, an access road to the mining towns of Tom Price and Paraburdoo and the ghost town of Wittenoom.

Over the next , the road crosses the Robe River, near the turnoff to Pannawonica, the Fortescue River, adjacent to the Fortescue River Roadhouse, and Maitland River, before it reaches Karratha Roadhouse. The roadhouse is located at the turnoff to Karratha, the nearby town of Dampier, and the Burrup Peninsula.  east, Roebourne is the gateway to Wickham, Point Samson and the ghost town of Cossack.

History

Origins
Before the mid-1920s, travelling north from Geraldton necessitated going through Mullewa, Dairy Creek and Gascoyne Junction. At first, this was little more than a rough bush track, at least partly used for extracting sandalwood. As there was often little water along this route, tanks with catchment roofs were built at eight locations along the track. The tanks were named for their distance from Carnarvon, at 40, 55, 85, 110, 125, 150, 180, and 200 miles. These tanks provided a life-saving function but when the road was later sealed, they became less important and were gradually removed except for Number 8 tank. Number 8 tank is still used by travellers and marks a point  from Geraldton,  from Carnarvon.

Western Australia's Nomenclature Advisory Committee proposed in October 1940 that a highway name be used to describe the main route from Midland to Geraldton, and extending to areas further north. The suggested name was Great Northern Highway, following on from the naming of the Great Eastern and Great Southern highways. By July 1941, the committee's proposal had expanded to three highway names for the roads in the state's northern areas: Great Northern Highway for the Midland Junction to Wyndham road, Geraldton Highway for Walebing–Mingenew–Geraldton route, and North West Coastal Highway for "the road from Geraldton to De Grey, via Northampton, Galena, Carnarvon, Boolaganoo, Winning Pool, Giralia, Yanrey, Onslow, Peedamullah, Mardie, Karratha, Roebourne, Whim Creek, Mundabullangana and Port Hedland". The proposal was well received by the local municipal councils and road boards.

The name North West Coastal Highway was gazetted on 21 April 1944, under section 10 of the Land Act, 1933–1939. Driving was difficult and hazardous all year round. The road was very dusty in the dry season, and some sections of the road were effectively impassable sand, while other sections contained limestone outcrops that damaged tyres. During the wet season, when rivers flooded, sections of road were essentially bogs, or worse still, were completely washed away.

Economic growth and development in Western Australia's northern regions in the 1940s prompted the state to quadruple road funding between 1946 and 1952. Two "gangs" of workers were allocated to a  length of North West Coastal Highway. Given the vast distance the highway travelled, and destructive cyclones in the Pilbara and Gascoyne that could destroy multiple weeks worth of work, the overall improvement was relatively insignificant. Over time, though, the road was improved.

Sealing
In the late 1950s a significant project was undertaken to seal the highway between Geraldton and Carnarvon. The sealed road had progressed northwards in the preceding years, but only by approximately  each year. The rate of work increased rapidly, and by 1960, a  stretch extending south from Carnarvon had been sealed. The project was completed in 1962 when the two sections converged at the 455-mile peg, and was officially opened on 1 September. Completion of the sealed road resulted in increased tourist traffic, and a longer tourist season.

A large cyclone swept through the Carnarvon area in February 1961, causing much devastation to the road network. Many floodways were completely washed away, and North West Coastal Highway was immersed in flood water for  either side of Onslow. Carnarvon was cut off from general traffic for two weeks, and the damage to the roads in the region took months to repair. Approval was given to realign the road further inland, where it would be less susceptible to flooding.

By the 1960s North West Coastal Highway had become a crucial connection for development in the Pilbara – including the pastoral industry, tourism, and the emergence of iron ore mining. In 1966 the traffic volume was up to 125 vehicles per day, and the unsealed road needed constant maintenance to cope with this demand. There were also frequent delays due to flooding. In 1966 the state government announced that the sealed road would be extended to Port Hedland, over a nine-year period. Substantial portions of the highway would also be relocated above the flood plain. The new alignment on higher ground would be  shorter, and would make bridging rivers easier.

Work started at Carnarvon, and  had been completed by 1969. Locally available material was used to great extent during construction, with techniques adjusted based on what was available; however, some resources were transported across vast distances. The bridges were designed to withstand twenty-year floods, but more severe possibilities were anticipated – the approaches were built lower than the bridge decks, so that excess water would flow around the bridges, rather than over them.

The sealing of North West Coastal Highway was nearing completion in 1973; additional resources provided to complete the work resulted in the final section, Port Hedland to Roebourne, being finished in only five months. An official opening ceremony was held at South Hedland on 6 December 1974, with the road pronounced open by Premier Charles Court. The final cost of the project was approximately $31 million, substantially more than the initial estimate of $17 million. This was mainly due to two factors: increased construction standards, and inflation, which rose from 4% to 13% between 1970 and 1974.

Further improvements
In the 1980s the highway's flood resistance was improved with the construction of new, higher-level bridges to replace lower crossings. Galena Bridge over the Murchison River opened on 9 December 1983, and a new bridge over the Harding River near Roebourne was opened on 22 March 1985. In the late 1980s the various sections of road across Western Australia's road network were upgraded or reconstructed, with the worst segments prioritised. In August 1988, work on upgrading  of North West Coastal Highway was completed, the final section between Geraldton and Carnarvon to have been brought up to standard.

The northernmost section of the highway, from Great Northern Highway to Port Hedland, was made part of Great Northern Highway in early 1996. Over a ten-year period from 1996 to 2006, numerous improvements were made to the highway, with sections widened, reconstructed, and realigned. Intersections and stretches through townsites were also redesigned, existing bridges were strengthened, and new bridges replaced older bridges or floodways. Additional work was necessary to repair damage from natural events. Sections washed away by floods in January 2003 were rebuilt, and opened in October of that year, and repairs to the damage from Cyclone Monty in March 2004 were completed that November.

The biggest individual project in this period, across all of rural Western Australia, was Stage 1 of the Geraldton Southern Transport Corridor. The project, constructed between March 2004 and December 2005 at a cost of $92.5 million, involved the relocation of railway tracks,  worth of road works, and grade separation of roads. North West Coastal Highway's southern terminus at Brand Highway was upgraded from a roundabout to an interchange, and an overpass was built for Durlacher Street to cross North West Coastal Highway. The highway was also made into a dual carriageway in the vicinity of the interchange. Stage 2 of the project, constructed between December 2008 and December 2009, provided a single carriageway connection from a traffic light-controlled intersection on the highway to Geraldton–Mount Magnet Road, with access to Geraldton Airport.

In 2013 work began on a project to seal the highway's shoulders from Yannarie River at Barradale to the Onslow turn-off; it is expected to be completed by mid-2015. Further work to widen the highway between Minilya and Barradale, including replacing two floodways with bridges, is expected to be completed by the end of 2017.

Major intersections

See also

 Highways in Australia
 List of highways in Western Australia

Notes

Coordinates

References

External links

Highways in rural Western Australia
Pilbara
Highway 1 (Australia)